Phil Maylin (born 20 April 1956) is a former Australian rules footballer who played with Carlton and Footscray in the Australian Football League (VFL) during the 1980s. 

Originally from Adelaide, Maylin played for South Australian National Football League (SANFL) club Woodville until recruited by Carlton prior to the 1980 VFL season. A utility, Maylin finished second in Carlton's 1982 Best and Fairest award and played mainly as a ruck-rover and midfielder. 

Maylin was a premiership player with Carlton in 1981 and 1982 but later struggled to hold his place in the side and transferred to Footscray for the 1985 VFL season. Two years later he joined Springvale Football Club in the Victorian Football Association (VFA) as captain-coach and led them to a premiership in 1987. He coached Eltham from 2003 to 2008.

References

External links

Blueseum profile

1956 births
Living people
Carlton Football Club players
Carlton Football Club Premiership players
Western Bulldogs players
Woodville Football Club players
Casey Demons players
Casey Demons coaches
Australian rules footballers from South Australia
Eltham Football Club coaches
Two-time VFL/AFL Premiership players